Herman Basudde (1958–1997) was a Ugandan kadongo kamu musician. Basudde was born in Masaka District, in southern Uganda.

Background
Born on December 5, 1958 to  Eria Katende and Dimitiria Namyalo, of Bubundo, Masaka. He attended Kibanda Primary School and Kitenga Primary School and is said not to have gone beyond Primary School.

Little is known of his early life. According to his brother Sserunjoji, the reason he did not go further may be due to lack of funds to facilitate his love and passion for music. His mother Namyalo narrates that Herman Basudde attended Kibanda and Butenga primary school. One of his classmates says that in Basudde's school years he was a quick learner, and had a passion for art and graphics which took most of his time. Basudde also joined a school choir which earned him credits due to his soft and Ilouder voice.

The legacy of Busudde in the field of music came a long way from his father. The late Mark Makumbi, a former Bukedde TV and CBS Radio presenter while giving the background of Kadongokamu singers, talks about Basudde. He says that his father was an X-soldier from second world war veteran. He had a white friend called Brown, who loved him so much. When the mission was accomplished and was time to depart from one another, Brown gave him a guitar saying take this, I don't have money to give you, let it be a souvenir to remember me from" on his return home, he kept the guitar because it was of no use to him. He started to play a guitar at home without anyone teaching him. As time went on, his mother tried to stop him from playing the guitar instead of doing household work or school homework; but his father insisted that he go ahead as he might prosper in a musical career. The guitar could hardly leave no space for books. This, in along with absolute poverty through which the family persisted, pushed him to drop out without completing his primary seven.

Whenever there was a party in the village, he could escort his guitar paving a way to entertain the guests. In return as excitement paves, they gave him their appreciation and encouragement in terms of money. Unfortunately, others saw this upside down. The youth mostly laid a plan to throw him down since he was earning presents and gifts wherever he could go and entertain.

As his culture, one day he entertained Christian at their local Catholic parish. He sang a song he entitled ”amajjiini ngetala luno" (the rampant demons). The priest was overwhelmed where by he told him to play it again and again. At that function, Basudde earned a lot of money offered to him. This troubled his rivals so much. They planned a way of taking him off.

In the area, there was a rebel group called “FEDEMU” which had captured most of the southern part of Southern Uganda. Peace was now in their hands. Basudde's rival youth approached them informing that Basudde had a gun. Immediately, they sagged his father's house. They searched the whole place. They grabbed him and took him for interrogation. They tortured him unceasingly while asking for the whereabouts of the gun. After all that, he was brought back home nearly to death.
He was taken to Masaka referral Hospital where he was treated for many days. He was later returned home and given medicine there. As he gained energy, his father advised him to leave the village or else he would lose his life.

In the mid 1980s, he was picked by Eria Katende and brought to Kampala.

Career
His career guide was the singer Livingstone Kasozi who trained him how to play a guitar, sing and perform live on stage. He toured East Africa countries, travelling to Kenya, Tanzania, and Rwanda. This tour raised him over USh 70 million, a huge amount at that time. 

Basudde is credited as one of the musicians who revived interest in baakisimba, mixing Western and Kiganda music to appeal to a new audience. He had a husky voice, and sang passionate songs about mischievous love affairs, philandering husbands, and bizarre witchcraft. In a popular song, Ekiwuka Ekyaga Muntamu, Basudde used metaphor to invoke the AIDS epidemic in Uganda. In the song, the narrator dreams of a lizard-like insect invading his home and despoiling life, food and sex.

Basudde died in an accident while travelling to his parents' house in Masaka, south of Kampala. His funeral was a national occasion, and the funeral fund raised USh 12 million. Some saw Basudde as a rebellious spirit. He had left the Catholic Church to adopt animism and was attacked by certain clergy for forsaking religion in favour of witchcraft. He was accused of sensationalising his music by bringing seductively dressed girls onto the stage and commercialising the Kadongo Kamu singers.

popularity
Basaaya Rocks Peter a historian says that Herman Basudde was a prophet since he could foretell what would happen before. His popularity is still rampant where by many upcoming artists visits his grave to seek wisdom.
Fred Ssebatta, one of Kadongokamu regents, asserts that Herman Basudde was creative and worked quickly. He continued by saying that it would be very difficult to compare Herman Basudde in writing music with anybody. He further said that whenever Herman Basudde could release a song, Ssebatta would target him on the second day.
On 12 October 2012, Gheto president Bobi wine paid a tribute to the great works of Herman Basudde. He narrates in time like this, 'how I wish prophet Herman Basudde could be around'... He left us to accomplish his mission but, his shoes are far big for us to wear' he said.
Basude composed in his head and couldn't repeat what he has earlier sung.
Herman Basudde toured East Africa countries, travelling to Kenya, Tanzania finally to Rwanda. This tour raised him over USh 70 million, a huge amount at that time.

Death and aftermath

Before his death, Basudde had foretold his death through words and actions. Aisha Nakito (widow) narrated what happened days before his death. On 10 June 1997, he went to meet Jane Basirika (concubine) after several days while touring EA . They had a meal in await for Serunjoji. As soon as Serunjoji came, he embraced him. They had had some misunderstanding back ago, so they had a family union. After all, they set for masaka.  His father had been paralyzed at home. On their way, they stopped at Lukaya road toll for a snack. Here, Basudde got annoyed with a certain man and he was about to fight him. Sylivester Busuulwa settled the matter. He started the vehicle with a lot of anger and at a high speed. Reaching Kabaale Bugonzi, a tragedy happened. As a lorry was overtaking, Basudde lost control and his vehicle overturned several times. "What a mess this man has caused me!" He had his last breath. Hermann Basudde, a famous Ugandan singer and guitarist died in a tragic accident while travelling to his parents' house in Masaka, south of Kampala.
Basudde had a huge following for his husky voice and the passion of his lyrics about mischievous love affairs, philandering husbands, bizarre witchcraft and other songs which propelled him from abject poverty to a fortune worth millions during his lifetime.
He had revolutionised the Kadongo Kamu (singers) who were known for their skillful guitar playing.
Before Basudde died he insisted that he be buried with his favourite "dry guitar", as he called it. He had noted that his long term colleague, Livingstone Kasozi had been buried holding his favourite cassette tape and he wanted his guitar to console him in the same way in the after life.
Basudde's funeral was a national occasion. There was an outpouring of grief at the vigil by the graveside. Television showed a sea of humanity attending his burial. An announcer on one of the FM radio stations broke down while telling of his death. And his funeral fund raised USh 12 million.
Basudde's songs got rave reviews in the local press. The Uganda Monitor newspaper dubbed them as "spiritually and politically inspiring". Some regretted that he could not still live to fight the foreign culture that was corrupting Ugandan minds via the FM stations.
Others saw Basudde as a rebellious spirit. He had left the Catholic Church to adopt animism and was attacked by certain clergy for forsaking religion in favour of witchcraft. He was accused of sensationalising his music by bringing seductively dressed girls onto the stage and commercialising the Kadongo Kamu singers.

His songs
Among them were Abakungubazi, abakyala kyabeeyi, abankuseere, abayiimbi, abayimbi mutuveeko, Africa, Akadda nyuma, or Kelementina, Akyalina nyoko, or Nanziri, or mulekwa, Buddu owedda, Bus dunia part one, Bus dunia part two, Byendabye, Byebalinanga, Byetwalaba, Ebiyita ekiro, or Ekiryo nomuwafu, Eggwala, Ekirooto kyeggulu, Ekitutwala Ku mbaga, Ekiwuka ekyaggwa mu ntamu, ekyali mu sabo part one, Ekyali mu sabo part two, Emikwano, enimiro yokukubuganga, Ensi egenze walala, Esomero lyabakyala, Esuuti ya kawemba or okwekuuma, Kabuladda Anthem, Kasamba lyanda, Kopolo Herman, Linda Ziwere, Milly Nanyondo, Mubune engoye, Mukyala mugerwa part one, Mukyala Mugerwa part two, Mulamu tonenya, Muwase nju, muyige okwambala. Mwami tonjeza, Mweraba Ngenze, Nabiryo ngenda kunoba, Namagembe, Namuddu, Namuleme, Okuduula, Okuzaala kwa leero, Olulimi oluganda, Olumbe, Omwavu, Pirisiira, Semukuutu. Taso funa akalambe, Tetukyalina bakazi, or omukazi akola, Tudaabirize omukama, Tulabye nnyo abalabi, Uganda ebadde etya, Waliwo byetwalaba, Walumbe e tanda among others. There are also songs which he collaborated with others like Nabiryo ngenda Kunoba with His sister Nabiryo, Kabuladda anthem with his Kabuladda guitar singers, Olumbe with Kasozi Livingstone and Mbalire kateteyi.

References

External links
 Download Herman Basudde Songs
 HERMAN BASUDDE: portrait of a musical prophet, 4 July 2016, The Observer 
 
 

1958 births
1997 deaths
Ganda people
People from Masaka District
Ugandan musicians